Franklin German (born September 22, 1997) is an American professional baseball pitcher for the Chicago White Sox of Major League Baseball (MLB). He has played in MLB for the Boston Red Sox.

Career

Amateur career
German graduated from Bishop McLaughlin Catholic High School in Spring Hill, Florida. He enrolled at University of North Florida and played college baseball for the North Florida Ospreys. In 2017, he played collegiate summer baseball with the Wareham Gatemen of the Cape Cod Baseball League.

New York Yankees
The New York Yankees selected German in the fourth round of the 2018 MLB draft. He spent his first professional season with the Gulf Coast Yankees and Staten Island Yankees. In 2019, German played with the Gulf Coast Yankees and Tampa Tarpons. He did not play for a team in 2020, due to the Minor League Baseball season being canceled.

Boston Red Sox
On January 25, 2021, the Yankees traded German and Adam Ottavino to the Boston Red Sox for a player to be named later. German pitched during 2021 with the Portland Sea Dogs of Double-A and started 2022 with Portland before being promoted to the Worcester Red Sox of Triple-A during the season. On September 17, the Red Sox added German to their active roster. He made his major-league debut that day, allowing four runs without retiring a batter while facing four batters in relief. In 43 minor-league relief appearances, he posted a 5–2 record with seven saves and a 2.72 earned run average (ERA) while striking out 64 batters in  innings. German was named the minor-league Relief Pitcher of the Year by the Red Sox organization.

On January 30, 2023, German was designated for assignment in order for the Red Sox to add newly acquired relief pitcher Richard Bleier to the 40-man roster.

Chicago White Sox
On February 3, 2023, German was traded to the Chicago White Sox in exchange for Theo Denlinger.

References

External links

1997 births
Living people
Boston Red Sox players
Gulf Coast Yankees players
Madison Mallards players
Major League Baseball pitchers
North Florida Ospreys baseball players
Portland Sea Dogs players
Sportspeople from Queens, New York
Baseball players from New York City
Staten Island Yankees players
Tampa Tarpons players
Wareham Gatemen players
Worcester Red Sox players